William Li or Li Bin (born 1974) is a Chinese business executive and entrepreneur. He is co-founder and CEO of the electric car manufacturer Nio.

Career

Bitauto Holdings Ltd. 
Bitauto Holdings Ltd. was founded by Li in 2000. It was Li's first major company where he served as CEO and chairman. He sold the company in 2013.

NIO 

In November 2014 Li founded Nio, a premium electric car company. Due to pollution, major Chinese cities were shrouded in gray smog. As a result, Li decided to bring back the Blue Sky (Blue Sky Coming). NIO Inc. is a pioneer in China's premium electric vehicle market.  By developing, producing and selling connected vehicles, NIO is driving innovation in connectivity, autonomous driving and artificial intelligence. In addition to vehicles, NIO offers its users a broad portfolio of charging solutions.

In 2018 the company went public opening at the New York Stock Exchange.

In 2021, NIO expanded outside China, selling cars in Norway.

See also 

 List of Chinese billionaires
 List of Chinese by net worth
 List of Peking University people

References 

1974 births
Businesspeople from Anhui
Living people
Chinese founders of automobile manufacturers
Peking University alumni
Chinese billionaires
Chinese chief executives in the automobile industry
NIO (car company) people
Automotive businesspeople